The Secretary of State for Infrastructure, Transport and Housing (SEITV) is a high-ranking official of the Ministry of Development of the Government of Spain. The SEITV is appointed by the King of Spain at the proposal of the Minister of Development.

The Secretary of State is responsible for planning and proposing the Ministry policy on transport infrastructure and for defining, proposing and carrying out the Ministry policy on land, maritime and air transport of nation-wide competence, as well as those related to port and airport transport infrastructures through its dependent bodies, public enterprises and agencies.

Likewise, the SEITV is responsible for proposing and carrying out the government policy on housing access, soil and architecture; innovation, quality and sustainability of building and of urban development policies according to the Sustainable Development Goals and the International Urban Agendas.

For these purposes, the Secretariat of State is structured through three main departments: the General Secretariat for Infrastructure, General Secretariat for Transport and the General Secretariat for Housing.

History

Although there have previously been some Secretariats of State with powers on sustainability and housing, the origin of this secretariat of State dates back to the Royal Decree of 17 December 1993, which created the Secretariat of State for Territorial Policy and Public Works. This secretariat was entrusted with «the preparation of the Infrastructure Master Plan, the National Hydrological Plan and the sectoral plans of the different modes of transport that develop the Master Plan».

In 1996, with the change of name of the Ministry of Development, that Secretariat of State was abolished and the Secretary of State for Infrastructure and Transport was created, assuming a very similar structure to the current one. With this reform, the Secretary of State loses the powers on housing that the Undersecretary of Development assumed.

In May 2000, the Secretariat was renamed the Secretariat of State for Infrastructures, recovering the competences in housing that it exercised through the Directorate-General for Housing, Architecture and Urbanism but losing the competences in transportation, which were transferred to the Undersecretariat.

In 2004, the Secretariat of State was renamed the Secretariat of State for Infrastructure and Planning, losing the competencies in housing that become part of the recovered Ministry of Housing. The transportation responsibilities continued separated when the General Secretariat for Transport was created with direct dependence on the Minister. From 2009 to end 2011 it was called Secretariat of State for Planning and Infrastructure.

Due to the economic crisis and the need to cut public spending, in late 2011 a multitude of competencies spread across various bodies were unified in a single one called Secretariat of State for Infrastructure, Transport and Housing, which was developed with a similar structure to that of the Secretary of State for Infrastructure and Transport of 1996.

Names
 Secretary of State for Territorial Policy and Public Works (1993–1996)
 Secretary of State for Infrastructure and Transport (1996–2000)
 Secretary of State for Infrastructure (2000–2004)
 Secretary of State for Infrastructure and Planning (2004–2009)
Secretary of State for Planning and Infrastructure (2009–2011)
 Secretary of State for Infrastructure, Transport and Housing (2011–present)

Organization chart
The Secretariat of State is composed by three main departments and three secondary departments:
 The General Secretariat for Infrastructure (SGI)
 The department of the SEITV directly carries out the investments on infrastructure, mainly focused on roads. It is also responsible for the management and maintenance of roads as well as supervising the infrastructure of the railway system through the Railway Safety Agency.
 The SGI is structured through the Directorate-General for Roads, the Railway Expropriations Division and the Deputy Directorate-General for Railway Planning.
 The General Secretariat for Transport (SGT)
 It's the department of the SEITV that manages the nation-wide transportation system and investigates transport accidents.
 The SGI is structured through the Directorate-General for Civil Aviation, the Directorate-General for the Merchant Navy and the Directorate-General for Land Transport. It has also a Transportation Studies and Technology Division.
 The General Secretariat for Housing (SGV)
 It's the department of the SEITV that carry out the government policy on housing, architecture, town planning and soil policy.
 The SGI is structured through the Directorate-General for Architecture, Housing and Soil and the Deputy Directorate-General for Housing Policy and Aid.
 The Unit for Emergencies, Coordination and Crisis Management
 This unit assists the Secretary of State in the definition, adoption, management, control and evaluation of the necessary measures and actions, in the area of competences attributed to the Ministry of Development, to guarantee the normal activity of the transport services and infrastructures.
 The Deputy Directorate-General for Infrastructure and Transport Planning
 It is the body responsible for planning and study the transport infrastructure system, planning the investments on this matters, carrying out an environmental respectful policy as wells as coordinating and managing the European funds for this responsibilities.
 The Deputy Directorate-General for International Relations
 It is the body responsible for coordinating and monitoring the international relations in the areas of competence of the Department, and of its representation in international institutions, especially the European Union.

Most of the public enterprises and agencies of the Department of Development are ascribed to the SEITV.

List of SEITVs

References

Secretaries of State of Spain
Transport in Spain
Housing in Spain
Infrastructure in Spain